NRK Sápmi (previously NRK Sámi Radio) is a unit of the Norwegian Broadcasting Corporation (NRK) that streams news and other programs in the Sami language for broadcast to the Sami people of Norway via radio, television, and internet. Regular radio news programs in Sami began in 1946, presented from Tromsø by the teacher Kathrine Johnsen (1917–2002), remembered today as "Sami Radio's Mother".

In 1976, NRK Sámi Radio moved to Kárášjohka (Karasjok), and in 1984 to its current headquarters (also in Kárášjohka). NRK Sápmi has about 17 journalists based in Deatnu (Tana), Guovdageaidnu (Kautokeino), Olmmaivaggi in Gáivuotna, Tromsø, Skånland, Tysfjord, Snåsa, and Oslo. Approximately 60 people are employed at the unit's headquarters.

NRK Sápmi broadcasts on FM radio in Finnmark County and in Oslo. The channel is also available nationwide on DAB.

See also 
Sameradion Sami-language broadcasting from Sweden)
Yle Sámi Radio (Sami-language broadcasting from Finland)
APTN
BBC Alba
Māori Television
NITV
PTS
TG4 
S4C
SABC
Te Reo (TV)
TITV
TRT Kurdî
WITBN

References

External links
NRK Sámi Radio Internet radio
NRK Sápmi
Kalstad ny NRK Sápmi-direktør [Kalstad, new director of NRK Sápmi] (16 April 2021)

1946 establishments in Norway
Television in minority languages
NRK
Radio stations established in 1946
Radio stations in Norway
Sámi culture
Sámi in Norway